is a Japanese female pilot, and a pioneer of overseas flight among female pilots along with Kiku Nishizaki. Her experience as a pioneer female pilot served as the basis for the lead character, played by Yōko Asaji, in the popular NHK Asadora TV series Kumo no jūtan in 1976.

Dream to be an Olympian
Born on 5 June 1911 in Hirosaki, Aomori Prefecture, and moved between many cities when she was very young due to her father's job in the military, she entered a girls' school in Osaka. As a girl 168 cm tall and weighed 62 kg, she was a large figure as a woman during the 1920s, and she entered the Japan Women's College of Physical Education in 1931. She started working as a Physical Education teacher at Ferris Girls' School in Yokohama, and won many medals as a discus thrower, dreaming to compete in the 1932 Summer Olympics.

Mabuchi was nominated as a discus thrower at the Los Angeles Olympics, remained to the final selection but was defeated. While she was having a hard time to overcome depression, Kiyoko Nagayama, her friend from college, asked her and try out for the Asia Aviation School together in May, 1933. The school was opened that year by a pioneer pilot Kinjirō Īnuma, who expanded his business of aircraft manufacture to train pilots.

The flight to Manchuria
In March, 1934, Mabuchi was licensed second class pilot, the 13th or the 18th among female pilot. One month later in April, she flew solo to Kurotake mountain on Izu Peninsula as part of her training, and personally to pay condolence to her senior pilot Park Kyung-won. In July, Mabuchi and Kiku Nishizawa asked two other second class female pilots to found  (Japan Women Aviatoers' Club).

She flew Salmson 2 to Kazuno, Akita and thanked her grandmother who supported her tuition to go to the aviation school, before departing on an overseas friendship flight bound to Manchuria. It was on 26 October 1933 when she and Kiku Nishizaki departed Tokyo to Manchuria, each of them aboard Salmson 2. Her plane was named Yellow Butterfly, after her first name Choko, while Nisizaki's was White Chrysanthemum after her first name Kiku. Mabuchi was the pilot in command with a first officer, carrying messages from the mayor of Kanagawa Prefecture, mayor of Yokohama as well as writings and paintings by elementary school pupils.  It took her nine days to cross the Sea of Japan and arrive at Manchurian :ja:新京 (Changchun) on 5 November, later than expected as her airplane broke down and she made an emergency landing on the way. Nizhisaki had arrived the previous day. Mabuchi returned to Japan and treated as one of the heroines to complete an international flight.

Her career as a pilot did not last long due to the onset of the Second Sino-Japanese War, and her flying plan to Germany was cancelled when female pilots were banned to fly airplanes in 1937.

As an educator

Mabuchi taught physical education classes and supported Nagayama who was paralyzed on one side surviving a plane crush. As the air raid in Tokyo intensified, they evacuated to Shizuoka prefecture in 1944, where they stayed together after the World War II. Mabuchi taught at a number of girls' schools all through her latter life.

Choko Mabuchi died on 23 February 1985 at Itō, Shizuoka, at the age of 73. She rests in Tama Cemetery in the suburb of Tokyo. Choko Mabuchi is a recipient of the Harmon Trophy in October 1934 as one of the two first Japanese female pilots to cross the Sea of Japan on an overseas flight.

References

Related books

External links 
Choko Mabuchi (Historical people in Tama Cemetery)
Kazuno Senjin Kenshokan 鹿角市先人顕彰館 Kazuno Hall of Ancestors, a public museum in Kazuno-shi, Akita.

1911 births
1985 deaths
Japanese aviators
Women aviators
Aviation pioneers
Japanese
Education in Japan
People from Aomori Prefecture
Japanese women aviators